Bazelat (Limousin: Balasac) is a commune in the Creuse department in the Nouvelle-Aquitaine region in central France.

Geography
The commune borders the département of Indre.

The river Abloux has its source in the commune.

Population

Sights
 The church, dating from the twelfth century.
 A restored public washhouse.

See also
Communes of the Creuse department

References

Communes of Creuse